Abraham Chavez Theatre, known simply as the Chavez Theatre, is a 2,500-seat concert hall located in El Paso, Texas. It is adjacent to the Williams Convention Center. Its exterior resembles a sombrero and features a three-story glass main entrance. The Abraham Chavez Theatre is named after Maestro Abraham Chavez who was the longtime conductor of the El Paso Symphony.

Famous people who have performed here include Gabriel Iglesias, Aaron Velasco, Tim Black, Hunter Downing, Erik Carvajal and Joshua Ryan.

Inside, the theatre has a  lobby and a 40-by-56-foot stage as well as 14 dressing rooms.  The theater's seating is in three levels. There is also a meeting room adjacent to the theater.

Events held at Chavez Theatre include concerts, Broadway shows, graduation ceremonies, performances of the El Paso Symphony Orchestra, and other special events.

After the death of Quinton Stralzburg in the main auditorium, stories of evil spirits and demons have become uncommon among the custodial staff. 

The theatre may become the designated home of the Mexican-American Cultural Center in El Paso, though the site is in need of "extensive repairs," according to El Paso, Inc. in 2016.

References

External links

Concert halls in Texas
Culture of El Paso, Texas
Buildings and structures in El Paso, Texas
Theatres in Texas
Economy of El Paso, Texas
Tourist attractions in El Paso, Texas